The Israel on Campus Coalition is a United States pro-Israel umbrella organization founded in 2002 under the auspices of the Charles and Lynn Schusterman Family Foundation and Hillel: The Foundation for Jewish Campus Life.

Mission and activities
ICC coordinates groups and students to respond to perceived anti-Israel activism.

The ICC collects and publishes data on the Boycott, Divestment and Sanctions (BDS) movement. It publishes an annual campus trends report on this topic. According to promotional material distributed to potential donors ICC monitors Open Hillel, Jewish student groups who disagree with International Hillel's policy of non-cooperation or suppression of opinions critical of Israel.

In 2016, ICC campaigned against Palestinian-American poet Remi Kanazi by secretly funding Facebook pages that appeared under the names of fake student organizations. Asked in 2018 about the pages, Facebook removed them for violating their "policies against misrepresentation".

An unsubstantiated report by the Forward claimed the I.C.C. chartered its research team to spy on an Open Hillel gathering at Wesleyan University in 2016. In material that the ICC distributed to donors, the ICC indicated it would continue to monitor the Open Hillel Conference. The monitoring of Open Hillel by ICC has created American student concerns about how a well financed organization with ties to Israel has built a "sophisticated political intelligence operation on U.S. campuses." The Forward also said, "It’s not clear how the ICC monitored the Jewish students at Open Hillel."

In November 2018, undercover footage from the censored Al Jazeera Documentary “The Lobby USA” revealed extensive conversations between ICC executives and Al Jazeera's undercover reporter. An ICC executive admits the organization “coordinates” and “communicates” with Israel's Ministry of Strategic Affairs. The footage also revealed the ICC includes the Ministry of Strategic Affairs on the organizations “operations and intelligence brief.” Despite the admittance that Israel on Campus Coalition coordinates with the Ministry of Strategic Affairs, an Israeli government ministry, records show the ICC is not registered under the Foreign Agent Registration Act.

Al Jazeera’s undercover investigation revealed further evidence of surveillance and smear campaigns conducted by the Israel on Campus Coalition. An executive outlines in the undercover footage the organization’s intelligence gathering and surveillance capabilities which the organization claims are directed towards pro-Palestine and BDS advocates. Executives describe the organization's surveillance efforts as a method of “psychological warfare.” The film ultimately reveals the ICC coordinates closely with and potentially operates Canary Mission. The organization has previously received criticized from progressive Jewish student organization Open Hillel, after the ICC recognized the Canary Mission blacklist "for deterring BDS activism and causing students to drop their support for pro-Palestine groups out of fear of repercussions.”

Leadership
Jacob Baime is the executive director of the Israel on Campus Coalition.

In August 2018, The Forward reported that "Baime, a savvy veteran of AIPAC’s campus political operation, took over as the ICC’s executive director in 2013. A 2008 graduate of Brandeis University, Baime stands out in the D.C. Jewish professional crowd for his relative youth and his polish. In late 2014 or early 2015, just a year into his role, Baime put the ICC on steroids. The ICC’s annual budget, which had hovered around $2 to $3 million, leapt to almost $8 million, far more than higher-profile groups, like the ZOA. And in the spring of 2015, according to a Jewish communal official who asked not to be named, Baime hired a political consulting firm to work on an Ohio State divestment referendum as it would a campaign for a state representative."

See also 
 Public diplomacy of Israel
 Israel lobby in the United States

References

External links
 Israel on Campus Coalition

Non-governmental organizations involved in the Israeli–Palestinian conflict
Israel–United States relations
Pro-Israel political advocacy groups in the United States